The 2005–06 San Bernardino mayoral election was held on November 21, 2005, and February 16, 2006, to elect the mayor of San Bernardino, California. It saw the election of Pat Morris.

Results

First round

Runoff

References 

San Bernardino
Mayoral elections in San Bernardino, California
San Bernardino
San Bernardino
San Bernardino